Viktor Imantovich Alksnis (born 21 June 1950) is a Russian politician and former Soviet Air Force colonel of Latvian descent. He is the chairman of Russian Center of Free Technologies, an organization intended to promote Free Software and open standards in Russia. He is a former member of the USSR Supreme Soviet, a member of the Russian All-People's Union and has also represented the Rodina (Motherland-National Patriotic Union) party in the Russian State Duma. From 2003 to 2007, he represented the People's Union party in the Fourth Duma.

Due to his political views and personal style, Alksnis was nicknamed "the Black Colonel", an allusion to the Soviet term "Black Colonels" for the Greek military junta of 1967-1974.

Family history
In the 1930s, Alksnis's grandfather, Yakov Alksnis was the head of the Soviet Air Force. He also took part in the military tribunal for the Case of Trotskyist Anti-Soviet Military Organization, which sentenced Mikhail Tukhachevsky and other high-ranking Soviet officers to death on Joseph Stalin's order. However, only eight months later, Yakov Alksnis himself was also arrested and executed.

Alksnis's grandmother spent 14 years in labor camps and his father was discriminated for being the son of an "enemy of the people".

During the destalinization of late 1950s Yakov Alksnis was posthumously rehabilitated; the Air Forces college in Riga was named in his honour. Despite these Stalin-era persecutions of his family members, Viktor Alksnis became a staunch supporter of the Soviet political system.

In 1973 Alksnis graduated from the Riga Higher Military Aviation Engineering School named for his grandfather as a qualified military radio engineer.

Alksnis's Latvian heritage was the subject of slander allegations in 2007 involving comments on the Internet.

Attitude to the breakup of the USSR

Viktor Alksnis was a strong opponent of the breakup of the Soviet Union and of the independence of the Baltic States. He claims that the Baltic states are apartheid regimes, that the Russian population in these states suffers repression.

In 1989 he was elected into the Supreme Soviet of the USSR. In 1990 he was elected to the Supreme Council of the Republic of Latvia. In 1990, he was one of the founders of a hard-line group "Soyuz" within the USSR Supreme Soviet. He once proposed the ousting of Soviet leader Mikhail Gorbachev from power, dissolving the parliament, outlawing all parties, the declaration of martial law and the handing of power to a Military "Committee of National Salvation", which would avoid the disintegration of the Soviet Union.

He has described the internationally non-recognized  Transnistrian Republic as the base from which the restoration of the Soviet Union would begin.

In later years Alksnis claimed to be a principal figure behind the Riga OMON, known for opposing the secession of Latvia from the USSR and actions such as the Soviet OMON assaults on Lithuanian border posts.

He was designated persona non grata in Latvia after he left the country in 1992., in Pravda, 1 November 2002. Since that time he has taken part in Russian politics, representing left-wing and nationalist positions. Alksnis was one of the leaders of the National Salvation Front that united nationalist and communist movements that opposed Yeltsin's policies. In 2005, he was named persona non grata in Ukraine as well, after he called for a Russian-Ukrainian border revision while speaking at a rally in Simferopol, Crimea.

Free software advocacy campaign

In 2007, Alksnis launched a campaign to promote the use of Free Software such as the Linux operating system in Russian state institutions to secure software independence.

In February 2008 he joined forces with Aleksandr Ponosov, a school teacher accused of software piracy, to form Center of Free Technology, a non-profit initiative which will research methods of usage of Free Software in the Russian education system.

Alksnis has met with project coordinator Aleksey Bragin to promote the development of the ReactOS operating system. He also invited Richard Stallman, the founder of the GNU project and Free Software Foundation to Moscow. The visit however was canceled by Stallman due to the controversy surrounding Alksnis.

Views on global politics
In 2006, Alksnis said in an interview that Israel and the United States are enemies of Iran's peaceful nuclear program, and their hostile attitude towards Iran is an attempt to cover-up the United States' mistakes in Iraq.

References

External links

  by Leon Charney on The Leon Charney Report

1950 births
Living people
People from Tashtagol
Russian people of Latvian descent
Members of the Congress of People's Deputies of the Soviet Union
Deputies of the Supreme Council of the Republic of Latvia
Soviet Air Force officers
Russian nationalists
Copyright activists
Defenders of the White House (1993)
A Just Russia politicians
21st-century Russian politicians
Third convocation members of the State Duma (Russian Federation)
Fourth convocation members of the State Duma (Russian Federation)